Higgins is a surname found in England and in Ireland, with several origins.

In England, the name originates from:
 the name Hugh
 the name Hig (both the son of Hugh and a diminutive of Hugh)
 Hicke, a diminutive of Richard
each then stemmed with the patronymic termination 'ings' meaning 'belonging to', or 'the son of'.

In Ireland, the name is the Anglicised form of the Gaelic name Ó hUiginn, 'descendant of Uiginn'. Uiginn being the Gaelic version of the Old Norse víkingr or Viking.

In business
Andrew Higgins, founder of Higgins Industries and inventor of the Higgins boat
Pattillo Higgins (1863–1955), American oil pioneer and businessman, known as the "Prophet of Spindletop"

In education and science
Aparna Higgins, Indian-American mathematician
Chris Higgins, British geneticist, Vice-Chancellor of Durham University
E. Tory Higgins (born 1946), American psychologist
Henry Higgins (botanist) (1814–1893), English botanist
Julian Higgins, British statistician
Michael W. Higgins (born 1948), Canadian academic and writer
Reynold Higgins (1916–1993), English archaeologist
William Higgins, Irish chemist
William Victor Higgins, American painter and teacher

In literature
Aidan Higgins, (born 1927), Irish writer
Beda Higgins, British poet and writer
Fiona Higgins, Irish writer
George V. Higgins (1939–1999), American attorney and author
Jack Higgins (1929–2022), pseudonym of British novelist Harry Patterson
Maol Sheachluinn na n-Uirsgéal Ó hUiginn (fl. c. 1400), Irish poet
Marguerite Higgins (1920–1966), American journalist and war correspondent
Michael D. Higgins, (born 1941), Irish poet and president
Rita Ann Higgins (born 1955), Irish poet and playwright
Sean mac Fergail Óicc Ó hUiccinn (died 1490), Irish poet
Tadg Óg Ó hUiginn (died 1448), Irish poet
Tadhg Dall Ó hUiginn (c. 1550-c.1591), Irish poet
Tadhg Mór Ó hUiginn, Irish poet
Tom O'Higgins (1917–2003), Irish politician

In military service
Jack Higgins (RAF officer) (1875–1948), Royal Flying Corps and Royal Air Force commander
Thomas J. Higgins (1831–1917), American soldier
William R. Higgins (1945–1990), United States Marine Corps colonel, killed in Lebanon

In music
Bertie Higgins (born 1944), American singer-songwriter
Billy Higgins (1936–2001), American jazz drummer
Chris Higgins, also known as "X-13", former The Offspring touring member
Damian Higgins, drum and bass DJ and producer
Dick Higgins (1938–1998), American composer, poet and Fluxus artist
Eddie Higgins (1932–2009), American jazz pianist, composer and orchestrator
 Jarad Higgins (1998–2019), American rapper known professionally as Juice WRLD
Jon B. Higgins (1939–1984), American Carnatic singer
Missy Higgins, Australian singer
The Higgins, Canadian band

In politics
Brian Higgins, U.S. Representative from New York
Clay Higgins, U.S. Representative from Louisiana
Clement Higgins (1844–1916), British MP from Norfolk
Frank W. Higgins, Governor of New York
H. B. Higgins, Australian politician and judge
Jim Higgins (British politician), British socialist
Joe Higgins (politician), Socialist Party MEP for Dublin; ex-TD
John Patrick Higgins, former U.S. Representative from Massachusetts
Peg Higgins (born c. 1949), member of the New Hampshire House of Representatives
Pete B. Higgins (born 1957), member of the Alaska House of Representatives
William L. Higgins (1867–1951), U.S. Representative from Connecticut

In sports
Alex Higgins (1949–2010, nicknamed "Hurricane Higgins"), Northern Irish snooker player
Andrew Higgins (born 1981), English rugby union footballer
Andy Higgins (1960–2021, born Andrew Martin Higgins), English football player
Andy Higgins (born 1993), Australian association football player
Arthur Higgins (died 1915), rugby league footballer who played in the 1910s
Chris Higgins (born 1983), American hockey player
David Higgins (born 1972), Irish golfer
Dylan Higgins (born 1991), Zimbabwean cricketer
Elijah Higgins (born 2000), American football player
Emma Higgins (born 1986), Northern Irish association footballer
Garin Higgins (born 1968), American football coach
Harry Higgins (1894–1979), English cricketer
Henry Higgins (1944–1978), English bullfighter
Jack Higgins, rugby league footballer who played in the 1940s
Jim Higgins (1897–1964), Scottish boxer of the 1910s, 1920s and 1930s
John Higgins (born 1975), Scottish snooker player
Johnnie Lee Higgins (born 1983), free agent wide receiver in the NFL
Luke Higgins (1921–1991), American football player
Mark Higgins (born 1971), British rally car driver
Pinky Higgins (1909–1969), American baseball player, manager, and scout
P. J. Higgins (born 1993), American baseball player
Rashard Higgins (born 1994), American football wide receiver
Roy Higgins (1938–2014), Australian jockey
Ruaidhrí Higgins (born 1984), Northern Irish football player and manager
Shaun Higgins (born 1988), Australian rules footballer
Tee Higgins (born 1999), American football wide receiver

In television and film
Clare Higgins (born 1955), English actress
John Michael Higgins (born 1963), American actor and comedian
Kate Higgins (born 1969), American voice actress, singer, and jazz pianist
Kenneth Higgins (1919–2008), British cinematographer 
Maura Higgins (born 1990), Irish television personality
Naomi Higgins, Australian writer and comedian
Paul Higgins (born 1964), British actor
Steve Higgins (born 1963), American comedian, writer and announcer
William Higgins (1942–2019), American director of gay pornographic films

Other professions
Arch Higgins, New York City Ballet soloist
Bertha G. Higgins (1872–1944), American suffragist, civil rights activist and clubwoman
Chester Higgins, Jr., American photographer
Edward Higgins (1864–1947), British Salvationist, 3rd General of the Salvation Army
Eoin Higgins, High Court of Northern Ireland jurist
Godfrey Higgins (1772–1833), English writer on mythology
Dame Joan Higgins, British academic and health service manager
Margaret Higgins, Scottish murderer
Rosalyn Higgins (born 1937), British lawyer and legal scholar, President of the International Court of Justice

Fictional characters 

Bubba Higgins, on the American TV sitcom Mama's Family, played by Allan Kayser
Henry Higgins, in the play Pygmalion and the derivative musical stage play and later movie, My Fair Lady
Jonathan Quayle Higgins III, on the American TV series Magnum, P.I., played by John Hillerman

See also
O'Higgins
Higginson
Huggins

References

English-language surnames
Surnames of English origin
Surnames of Irish origin
Anglicised Irish-language surnames
Patronymic surnames
Surnames from given names